Hurstville railway station is located on the Illawarra line, serving the Sydney suburb of Hurstville. It is served by Sydney Trains T4 line services and NSW TrainLink South Coast line services.

History

Hurstville station opened on 15 October 1884 on the terminus of the Illawarra railway line from Redfern. On 26 December 1885, the line was extended to Sutherland. The station initially had two side platforms and two through running lines. When the line was quadruplicated in 1925, the station was rebuilt with two island platforms, with the southern platform serving the Illawara main line and the northern platform serving the Illawara Local (IL) line.

The Illawara Local pair of tracks end at Hurstville, with the up track continuing a little further to the King Georges Rd underpass. Both tracks merge onto the Illawara mainline. There are also three sidings branching off the Up Illawara Local, which are now unused with some track lifted.

In 1920, five people were killed when two trains collided while one was shunting at the station.

In 1965, the air rights above the platforms were covered by the Hurstville Super Centre shopping centre, one of the first suburban stations in Sydney to receive such treatment of its overhead airspace. The original station buildings survived underneath until demolished during refurbishment in the early 1990s. The centre was refurbished in 2008 and rebranded Hurstville Central.

There have previously been plans to build several residential towers above the station but these plans have been shelved over concerns about the integrity of overhead supports in the event of a derailment.

In late 2019, as part of the Transport for NSW's More Trains More Services program, a crossover is proposed to be built east of the station, to allow Hurstville to Bondi Junction all station services to swap operation from the Illawarra Local tracks to the Illawarra Main tracks and utilise platforms 3 & 4 instead of 1 & 2. The crossover will optimise the capacity of T4 and South Coast Line services along the Illawarra railway line corridor.

Platforms & services

Transport links

Punchbowl Bus Company operates ten routes via Hurstville station:
450: to Strathfield station via Roselands Shopping Centre
940: to Bankstown station via Riverwood
941: to Bankstown station via Roselands Shopping Centre
943: to Lugarno
945: to Bankstown station via Riverwood
953: to Kyle Bay, Connells Point & South Hurstville
954: to Hurstville Grove
955: to Mortdale via Oatley

Transdev NSW operates eight routes via Hurstville station:
452: Beverly Hills station to Rockdale station
453: to Rockdale station via Carlton
455: Kingsgrove to Rockdale Plaza
947: to Kogarah station via Ramsgate
958: to Rockdale Plaza via Carss Park
959: to Bald Face
970: to Miranda station via Sylvania Heights
971: to South Cronulla via Sylvania & Miranda
M91 to Parramatta station via Bankstown station

Transit Systems operate three routes to and from Hurstville station:
410 to Marsfield
490: to Drummoyne
491: to Five Dock

Hurstville railway station is served by two Nightride routes:
N10: Sutherland station to Town Hall station
N11: Cronulla station to Town Hall station

Trackplan

References

External links 

Hurstville station details Transport for New South Wales
Hurstville Station Public Transport Map Transport for NSW

Easy Access railway stations in Sydney
Railway stations in Sydney
Railway stations in Australia opened in 1884
Georges River Council
Illawarra railway line